For general overviews of UK politics since 1945 see:
 Postwar Britain (1945–1979)
 Political history of the United Kingdom (1979–present)
Whilst coverage of British social history over the same period can be found below
 Social history of Postwar Britain (1945–1979)
 Social history of the United Kingdom (1979–present)

See also

 Post-war consensus
 Premiership of Margaret Thatcher
 Premiership of Tony Blair
 Premiership of Gordon Brown
 Premiership of David Cameron
 Premiership of Theresa May
 Premiership of Boris Johnson
Premiership of Liz Truss
Premiership of Rishi Sunak
 Thatcherism